Ronald Dale Harris is a computer programmer who worked for the Nevada Gaming Control Board in the early 1990s and was responsible for finding flaws and gaffes in software that runs computerized casino games. Harris took advantage of his expertise, reputation and access to source code  to illegally modify certain slot machines to pay out large sums of money when a specific sequence and number of coins were inserted. From 1993 to 1995, Harris and an accomplice stole thousands of dollars from Las Vegas casinos, accomplishing one of the most successful and undetected scams in casino history. 

Towards the end of his stint, Harris shifted his focus to the probability game Keno, for which he developed a program that would determine which numbers the game's pseudorandom number generator would select beforehand. When Harris' accomplice, Reid Errol McNeal, attempted to redeem a high value winning keno ticket at Bally's Atlantic City Casino Hotel in Atlantic City, New Jersey, casino executives became suspicious of him and notified New Jersey gaming investigators. The investigation led authorities to Harris and after a trial was sentenced to seven years in prison.  He was released from prison after serving two years and currently resides in Las Vegas.

Harris is listed in the Nevada Gaming Control Board's black book and prohibited from entering casinos.
 
Harris’ story can be seen on the Biography Channel, History Channel and Discovery Channel program Breaking Vegas, which features interviews and reenactments of some of Harris' casino-breaking scheme.  The Travel Channel's  Vegas Cheaters Exposed also briefly explains his story.

See also 
 Gambling
 Cheating in casinos

References

External links

Nevada Exclusion List record
New Jersey Exclusion List record

American computer programmers
1956 births
Living people
American people convicted of fraud